Into the West is the debut album released in 2004 by New Zealand singer, Yulia (Yulia MacLean). That same year, the album was rereleased in December as a two disc special edition, entitled Into The West Special Christmas Edition.

Track listing

Original release
"Into The West"
"Scarborough Fair"
"Angel"
"The Prayer"
"L'hymne à l'amour"
"Hoki Hoki Tonu Mai/E Pari Ra"
"Softly Whispering I Love You"
"I Go To Sleep"
"If You Go Away"
"One Day I'll Fly Away"
"Ombra mai fu"
"Russia"
"Bailero"
"Otchi Tchornia"

Special Christmas Edition
The Special Christmas Edition contained a bonus disc with the tracks:
"I'll Be Home For Christmas"
"Teehaya Noch (Silent Night)"
"Mary's Boy Child"

Charts

Certifications

References

2004 debut albums
Yulia MacLean albums